The North, Central American and Caribbean Masters Athletics (NCCMA, or NCCWMA) is part of World Masters Athletics,

responsible for organizing masters athletics regional competitions in an area covering North America,

Central America, and the Caribbean.

All athletes 35 years of age or older are eligible to compete. The biennial Championships are held in alternate years with the WMA Outdoor Championships.

History

References

External links

Athletics organizations
Masters athletics (track and field)
Masters athletics (track and field) competitions
Biennial athletics competitions